Natalie Paul is an American actress. She has acted in several television shows such as The Deuce, Smash, The Sinner, and Power. She is best known for playing Doreen Henderson on Show Me a Hero and for her role as Antoinette in the film Crown Heights.

Early life
Paul graduated with a B.A. from Yale University and a MFA from the New York University Tisch School of the Arts Graduate Acting Program. She is of Haitian descent.

Career
Paul's first series regular was in the Yonkers housing drama Show Me a Hero as the budding community organizer Doreen Henderson. Her first film role was in Crown Heights in which she played the female lead. The film won several accolades, including the Audience Award at the Sundance Film Festival in 2017. Paul earned an NAACP Image Award for her role. Her subsequent series regular role was in the 1970s Times Square drama The Deuce as newspaper reporter Sandra Washington.

In 2018, Paul had a supporting role in the HBO show Random Acts of Flyness. In the same year, Paul starred in the former Lifetime thriller series You as Karen Minty.

She also starred in the second season of The Sinner on USA.

Paul has written and directed two short films, Everything Absolutely and Sweet Tea.

Awards and nominations
Paul was nominated for a 2018 NAACP Image Award for Outstanding Actress in a Motion Picture and won the 2018 Black Reel Award for Outstanding Actress for her role in Crown Heights.

Filmography

Film

Television

Other work

References

External links
 
 

American television actresses
Living people
American people of Haitian descent
Actresses from New York City
People from Brooklyn
1986 births
21st-century American women